Inspirational Life Television (iLifeTV) was an American cable TV network that existed until 2009.  It mainly served as a complement network to sister network The Inspiration Network, and mainly featured Christian lifestyle and home programming, along with sitcom and drama repeats, and national news from the American News Network.

History
iLifeTV was replaced with Halogen TV on October 24, 2009. Halogen TV and the Documentary Channel would be replaced with Pivot TV on August 1, 2013. Pivot TV would later be discontinued on October 31, 2016.

Television channels and stations disestablished in 2009
Defunct television networks in the United States